Leonardo Parasole (born c. 1570) was an Italian engraver on wood of the late-Mannerist and early-Baroque periods.

He was born and remained in Rome throughout his life. Parasole designed cuts for the Herbal book written by Castore Durante, physician to Pope Sixtus V. He also engraved the wood-cuts to a Testamentum novnm, arabice et latine''' and several prints from the designs of Antonio Tempesta, including an Annunciation.

 Personal life 
Parasole married the engraver Isabella Parasole, and discarded his original last name, Norsini or Norcino'', in favor of his wife's more distinguished last name.

His son, Bernardino Parasole, was also an engraver and painter.

References

1570s births
Italian engravers
Italian Baroque painters
Year of death unknown